Aliabad  (Burushaski/) is the administrative and commercial center of the Hunza District of Gilgit–Baltistan, Pakistan , Northern Areas of Pakistan).

Location
The town is located in a relatively wide section of the Hunza Valley, in the northeastern corner of the Karakoram range, between two forks of the Hunza River. 
In May 2010 government officials warned that the nearby Attabad lake was close to flooding the area.

Like most localities in Hunza–Nagar, Aliabad lies along the Karakoram Highway, which crosses this mountainous district.

Climate
With virtually no rainfall during the year, Aliabad features a cold desert climate (BWk) under the Köppen climate classification. The average temperature in Aliabad is 11.0 °C, while the annual precipitation averages 125 mm. November is the driest month with 2 mm of rainfall, while May, the wettest month, has an average precipitation of 29 mm.

July is the warmest month of the year with an average temperature of 23.6 °C. The coldest month January has an average temperature of -3.0 °C.

Nearby
 To the West:
Hassanabad, Pakistan
Further afield: Nasirabad, Hussainabad, Sikandarabad, Jafarabad, Khizerabad
 To the East:
 Baltit Fort, in Karimabad
 Altit Fort, in Altit
 Ganish Village, Hyderabad village east of aliabd
Further afield: Ahmedabad
 To the South:
 Murtazaabad
 Nagar Valley

References 

Populated places in Hunza District